Flying Fists is a 1937 American film directed by Robert F. Hill.

The film is also known as The Last Comeback (American alternative title).

Plot
Hal Donovan gets into a fight with ex-heavyweight champion Slug Cassidy at a lumber camp in the north woods. Slug takes a bad beating and he and his trainer, Spider, urge Hal to become a professional boxer. Soon, "Chopper" Hal proves to be a natural and is beating all comers. He meets Kay Conrad, who is struggling to support her father, an ex-fighter invalided for life in the ring, and her young brother Dickie. Kay hates everything connected to the sport, and Hal keeps her ignorant of his profession. But Slug and Spider tell the Conrads of Hal's identity as "Chopper" Hal, and Kay breaks off the engagement while Hal takes to the open road. Hal, now a tramp, picks up odd jobs where he can find them and one of them leads him to a training camp where he meets Slug and Spider with their new fighter Lion Lee. He also meets Kay and learns that her father is in desperate need of money. He accepts Spider's offer to fight Lee, on the condition that he take a dive in the third round. Kay learns of this and begs Hal to fight an honest fight if he is determined to fight. He tells Spider that he'll fight Lee on honest terms and the match is on.

Cast
Bruce Bennett as Hal "Chopper" Donovan, aka Hal Smith
Jeanne Martel as Katherine "Kay" Conrad
Fuzzy Knight as Spider
J. Farrell MacDonald as Bill "One-Punch" Fagin
Guinn "Big Boy" Williams as Slug Cassidy
Dickie Jones as Dickie Martin
Charles Williams as Meggs, the Reporter
John Elliott as Jim Conrad
William "Billy" Benedict as Monk, Tall Kid
Jack "Tiny" Lipson as Duncan
Buster the Dog as Fella - Hal's Dog
Friday the Dog as Lady, Kay's Dog

External links

1937 films
1937 drama films
American boxing films
American black-and-white films
American drama films
Films about lumberjacks
1930s English-language films
Films directed by Robert F. Hill
1930s American films